Yusuf Ziya Öniş Stadium is a multi-purpose stadium in Istanbul, Turkey.  It is currently used mostly for association football matches and is the home ground of TFF Second League team Sarıyer S.K. It was announced as the location for the Istanbul Rams, a team in the European League of Football, but was later changed to the Maltepe Hasan Polat Stadium. The stadium was built in 2009 and currently holds 4,100 people.

References

External links
Soccerwiki
Istanbulsporenvanteri

Football venues in Turkey
Multi-purpose stadiums in Turkey
Sports venues completed in 2009
Istanbul Rams
2009 establishments in Turkey
American football venues in Europe
European League of Football venues